Escape: Psycho Circus is an electronic music festival held in Southern California around Halloween. It is one of Insomniac Events music festivals, running annually since 2011. There are Halloween walk-through mazes, themed stages, and costumed performers. Genres include EDM, house, dance, electro house, drum and bass, techno, dance-punk, hardstyle, dubstep, trance, and more.

Stages that have been hosted by the event include Insomniac's brands: Audiotistic, Basscon, Bassrush, and Factory 93. Stages have also been hosted by artists such as Richie Hawtin's ENTER., Jamie Jones presents Paradise, Laidback Luke's Super You & Me, and Nicole Moudaber's MOODzone. The event was originally named Escape from Wonderland, but was later changed to Escape: Psycho Circus. The event is centered around Halloween and traditional horror themes.

History

2011
The festival debuted in 2011 under the name "Escape From Wonderland". It was held by Insomniac Events at the National Orange Show Event Center (or NOS Event Center) in San Bernardino, CA, featuring artists; Afrojack, Benny Benassi, Cedric Gervais, and Crizzly.

2012
For Escape's second year, they returned to the NOS Event Center in Southern California.

2013
Escape From Wonderland took place in the San Manuel Amphitheater in Southern California, .

2014
In 2014, the festival adopted the name Escape: All Hallows Eve and returned to the NOS Events Center in Southern California.

2015
For 2015, Escape Halloween's theme was Escape: Psycho Circus. It was hosted in the NOS Events Center in Southern California. The lineup included Adam Auburn, Eric Prydz, Joris Voorn, and Paul Van Dyk amongst many others.

2016

For 2016, Escape returned with the theme Psycho Circus to the NOS Center and hosted Yellow Claw, The Chainsmokers, Hardwell, Armin van Buuren, and Kaskade among others. This is the first year Richie Hawtin's ENTER. did not host the Cannibals' Tea Party, techno stage.

2017 
Escape: Psycho Circus took place at the NOS Events Center in San Bernardino, California featuring Tiesto, DJ Snake, NGHTMRE, Marshmello, and more. Audiotistic hosted a stage and Basscon brought hardstyle to the Halloween party. Bassrush hosted The Chopping Block for two nights. Factory 93 hosted both nights at the Cannibals' Tea Party with Jamie Jones presented Paradise on and Nicole Moudaber's MOODzone.

General event information 

The event is held at the National Orange Show event center in San Bernardino, California. The event center holds four main stage tents. The four stages at this event are the Slaughterhouse, Ghouls' Graveyard, The Chopping Block, and Cannibal's Tea Party. Along with the performance stages, the center holds mazes and art galleries that are tied into the Halloween-themed atmosphere.

Community 

Since 2011, Insomniac has worked with a charity in the San Bernardino area. They allocate $1 per ticket transaction and $10 per guest list attendee. Below are a few of the charities that Insomniac has worked with in the past few years:

Brent Shapiro Foundation

Starting in 2005, Brent Shapiro Foundation works to bring awareness to alcohol and drug dependency.

San Bernardino Sheriff’s PRCA Pro Rodeo

San Bernardino Sheriff’s PRCA Pro Rodeo, started in 1957, hosts a rodeo and hopes to foster a better relationship between law enforcement and the community.

San Bernardino Symphony Orchestra Music in Education Program

Founded in 1929, the San Bernardino Symphony gives access to symphonic music available to those in San Bernardino and Riverside counties.

Second Harvest Food Bank

The Second Harvest Food Bank began in 1980 and distributes food to those in need.

See also
Official Website
Insomniac Events Website

References

External links

Music festivals established in 2011
Electronic music festivals in the United States
Music festivals in California